The Eis Valley Railway is a branch line in the German state of Rhineland-Palatinate, that runs through the Palatine Forest. It runs from Grünstadt in a southwesterly direction through the valley of the Eisbach (or "Eis") to Enkenbach. The section from Grünstadt to Eisenberg was opened as early as 1876 by the Palatine Northern Railway Company. The iron ore industry in and around Eisenberg gave the line considerable importance for the transport of goods, whilst passenger services played a rather secondary  role. The remaining stretch of line to Enkenbach was not completed until 1932 under the direction of the Deutsche Reichsbahn. After passenger services had been withdrawn in 1976, strategic considerations during the Cold War prevented its complete closure. Goods traffic between Eisenberg and Enkenbach ended in 1988. In the period from 1994 to 2001 the line between Grünstadt and the Eiswoog reservoir was re-opened; the remaining section, however, stayed closed. Goods traffic ceased entirely in 2001.

Literature

References

External links 

 Infos zur Eistalbahn
 Förderverein Eistalbahn e. V.
 Bilder der Tunnelportale

Transport in Rhineland-Palatinate
Railway lines in Rhineland-Palatinate
Palatinate Forest
Donnersbergkreis
Buildings and structures in Bad Dürkheim (district)